Clementi Secondary School is a secondary institution in Fortress Hill, North Point, Hong Kong.  Founded by the 17th British Governor of Hong Kong Sir Cecil Clementi, the school was the first to use Chinese as the primary medium of instruction in Hong Kong.

History
The Governor of Hong Kong, Cecil Clementi, who had a profound interest in the Chinese language, decided to establish a school using Chinese as the main medium of instruction.  In 1926, Government Vernacular Middle School (官立漢文中學) was founded.  Government Vernacular Middle School is the first government school to use Chinese as the main medium of instruction. Li King Hong, the then-Chinese language inspector of schools, was appointed as the first principal of the school.

During World War II, the school suspended its operations under the Japanese Occupation of Hong Kong.  After the war, the school was renamed Government Vernacular Senior Middle School (官立漢文高級中學).  It was renamed again in 1951 to Clementi Middle School (金文泰中學) and in 1988 to Clementi Secondary School, after the governor.

The school has been relocated several times:

 1926-1927 26-28 Hospital Road (now site of Lok Sin Tong Leung Kau Kui College)
 1927-1941 Pok Fu Lam Road 
 1945-1946 Bridge Street (now Chinese YMCA of Hong Kong Bridge Centre)
 1946-1948 Wood Road (formerly Government Trade School Building c. 1937)
 1948-1961 28 Kennedy Road

It has been at the current site of 30 Fortress Hill Road since September 23, 1961.

The school principal is currently Mrs. Fung Lai Miu-yee, who succeeded Ms. Li Sui-wah in 2013.

Notable alumni

Politicians, government officials, and legislators
 Sir Kenneth Fung Ping-fan, Former Senior Chinese Unofficial Member in Urban Council, Executive Council and Legislative Council.
 Tsang Yam Pui, Former Commissioner of Hong Kong Police Force.
 Lee Ming-kwai, Former Commissioner of Hong Kong Police Force.
 Leung Kwok-hung, Politician, Member of Hong Kong Legislative Council, Chairman of the League of Social Democrats.
 Tam Goossen, Politician, New Democratic Party of Canada.
 Roy Ho, Member of Executive Council (2004 to 2008), Green Party of Ontario.
 Eddie Ng Hak-kim, Secretary for Education of the Hong Kong Government, Member of the Executive Council, Former Chairman of Hong Kong Examinations and Assessment Authority (HKEAA)

Academics
 Prof. Daniel Chee Tsui, physicist, a graduate of the university preparatory class of Clementi. Nobel Physics Prize Laureate for his contributions to the discovery of the fractional quantum Hall Effect. 
 Prof. Sau Lan Wu, physicist. Enrico Fermi and Vilas Professor of Physics at University of Wisconsin-Madison and winner of 1995 High Energy and Particle Physics Prize of the European Physical Society for "the first evidence of three-jet events in E+E-collisions at PETRA"
 Prof. Wong Cheuk-Yin, Physicist, a fellow of American Physical Society, former chairman of Overseas Chinese Physics Association, U.S.A., now working at Oak Ridge National Laboratory
 Prof. Ng Cheuk-Yiu, Chemist, Distinguished Professor of Chemistry, University of California at Davis
 Prof. Leung Pak-wah Edwin, medalist of Ellis Island Medal of Honor and Professor of Asian Studies at Seton Hall University, U.S.A.

Business 
 Peggy Cherng, Chinese-American billionaire businesswoman and electrical engineer

External links

Official website

North Point
Secondary schools in Hong Kong
Government schools in Hong Kong
Educational institutions established in 1926
1926 establishments in Hong Kong